The SSM-N-8A Regulus or the  Regulus I was a United States Navy-developed ship-and-submarine-launched, nuclear-capable turbojet-powered second generation cruise missile, deployed from 1955 to 1964. Its development was an outgrowth of U.S. Navy tests conducted with the German V-1 missile at Naval Air Station Point Mugu in California. Its barrel-shaped fuselage resembled that of numerous fighter aircraft designs of the era, but without a cockpit. Test articles of the Regulus were equipped with landing gear and could take off and land like an airplane. When the missiles were deployed they were launched from a rail launcher, and equipped with a pair of Aerojet JATO bottles on the aft end of the fuselage.

History

Design and development

In October 1943, Chance Vought Aircraft Company signed a study contract for a  range missile to carry a  warhead. The project stalled for four years, however, until May 1947, when the United States Army Air Forces awarded Martin Aircraft Company a contract for a turbojet powered subsonic missile, the Matador. The Navy saw Matador as a threat to its role in guided missiles and, within days, started a Navy development program for a missile that could be launched from a submarine and use the same J33 engine as the Matador. At its extreme range the missile had to hit within  of its target 50% of the time.

Regulus development was preceded by Navy experiments with the JB-2 Loon missile, a close derivative of the German V-1 flying bomb, beginning in the last year of World War II.

The missile resembled an F-84 fighter aircraft, but without a cockpit, and test versions were equipped with landing gear so that they could be recovered and re-used. After launch, Regulus would be guided toward its target by control stations, typically by submarines or surface ships equipped with guidance equipment. It could also be flown remotely by chase aircraft. (Later, with the "Trounce" system (Tactical Radar Omnidirectional Underwater Navigational Control Equipment), one submarine could guide it). Army-Navy competition complicated both the Matador's and the Regulus' developments. The missiles looked alike and used the same engine. They had nearly identical performances, schedules, and costs. Under pressure to reduce defense spending, the United States Department of Defense ordered the Navy to determine if Matador could be adapted for their use. The Navy concluded that the Navy's Regulus could perform the Navy mission better.

Regulus had some advantages over Matador. It required only two guidance stations while Matador required three. It could also be launched quicker, as Matador's boosters had to be fitted while the missile was on the launcher while Regulus was stowed with its boosters attached. Finally, Chance Vought built a recoverable version of the missile, designated KDU-1 and also used as a target drone, so that even though a Regulus test vehicle was more expensive to build, Regulus was cheaper to use over a series of tests. The Navy program continued, and the first Regulus flew in March 1951.

Due to its size and regulations concerning oversize loads on highways, Chance Vought collaborated with a firm that specialized in trucking oversize loads to develop a special tractor trailer combination which could move a Regulus I missile.

Ships and submarines deployed with Regulus I

Tunny and her sister boat  were the United States's first nuclear deterrent patrol submarines. Halibut, with its extremely large internal hangar could carry five missiles and was intended to be the prototype of a whole new class of cruise missile firing SSG-N submarines.

The Navy strategy called for four Regulus missiles to be at sea at any given time. Thus, Barbero and Tunny, each of which carried two Regulus missiles, patrolled simultaneously. Growler and Grayback, with four missiles each, or Halibut, with five, could patrol alone. Operating from Pearl Harbor, Hawaii, the five Regulus submarines made 40 nuclear deterrent patrols in the Northern Pacific Ocean between October 1959 and July 1964, including during the Cuban Missile Crisis of 1962. According to the documentary "Regulus: The First Nuclear Missile Submarines" by Nick T. Spark, their primary task in the event of a nuclear exchange would be to eliminate the Soviet naval base at Petropavlovsk-Kamchatsky. These deterrent patrols represented the first ever in the history of the submarine Navy and preceded those made by the Polaris missile firing submarines.

The Regulus firing submarines were relieved by the s carrying the Polaris missile system. Barbero also earned the distinction of launching the only delivery of missile mail.

Additional submarines including USS Cusk and USS Carbonero were equipped with control systems that allowed them to take control of a Regulus in flight, thus extending its range in a tactical situation.

Regulus was also deployed by the U.S. Navy in 1955 in the Pacific on board the cruiser . These four s each carried three Regulus missiles on operational patrols in the Western Pacific. Macon last Regulus patrol was in 1958, Toledo in 1959, Helena in 1960, and Los Angeles in 1961.

Ten aircraft carriers were configured to operate Regulus missiles (though only six ever launched one).  did not deploy with the missile but conducted the first launch of a Regulus from a warship.  also did not deploy but was involved in two demonstration launches.  and  each conducted one test launch.  deployed to the Mediterranean carrying three Regulus missiles.  deployed once to the Western Pacific with four missiles in 1955. RAM converted the Regulus cruise missiles into an unmanned aerial vehicle (UAV): Regulus missiles would be launched from cruisers or submarines, and once in flight, guided to their targets by carrier-based pilots with remote control equipment.

Replacement and legacy
Despite being the U.S. Navy's first underwater nuclear capability, the Regulus missile system had significant operational drawbacks. In order to launch, the submarine had to surface and assemble the missile in whatever sea conditions it was in. This guidance method was susceptible to jamming and since the missile was subsonic, the launch platform remained exposed and vulnerable to attack during its flight duration; destroying the ship would effectively disable the missile in flight.

Production of Regulus was phased out in January 1959 with delivery of the 514th missile; in 1962, it was redesignated RGM-6. It was removed from service in August 1964. Some of the obsolete missiles were expended as targets at Eglin Air Force Base, Florida. Regulus not only provided the first nuclear strategic deterrence force for the United States Navy during the first years of the Cold War and especially during the Cuban Missile Crisis, preceding the Polaris missiles, Poseidon missiles, and Trident missiles that followed, but it was also the forerunner of the Tomahawk cruise missile.

Following retirement, a number of Regulas I missiles were converted for target drone usage under the designation BQM-6C.

Regulus II

The Regulus II missile was a completely new design with improved guidance and double the range, and was intended to replace the Regulus I missile. Regulus II-equipped submarines and ships would have been fitted with the Ships Inertial Navigation System (SINS), allowing the missiles to be aligned accurately before take-off.

Forty-eight test flights of Regulus II prototypes were carried out, 30 of which were successful, 14 partially successful and four failures. A production contract was signed in January 1958 and the only submarine launch was carried out from Grayback in September 1958.

Due to the high cost of the Regulus II (approximately one million dollars each), budgetary pressure, and the emergence of the UGM-27 Polaris SLBM (submarine-launched ballistic missile), the Regulus II program was canceled on 18 December 1958. At the time of cancellation Vought had completed 20 Regulus II missiles with 27 more on the production line. Production of Regulus I missiles continued until January 1959 with delivery of the 514th missile, and it was withdrawn from service in August 1964.

Both Regulus I and Regulus II were used as target drones after 1964.

Surviving examples 

The following museums in the United States have Regulus missiles on display as part of their collections:
Carolinas Aviation Museum, Charlotte, North Carolina
Regulus I missile in launch position at the Carolinas Aviation Museum in Charlotte, North Carolina. It is mounted on a catapult launching stand used for aircraft carrier launches and was restored late 2006 after having been on outdoor display for a number of years.
Frontiers of Flight Museum, Dallas Love Field, Texas
Regulus II missile
Intrepid Sea-Air-Space Museum, New York City, New York
Regulus I cruise missile can be seen ready for simulated launch on board  at the Intrepid Sea-Air-Space Museum in New York City.
Point Mugu Missile Park, Naval Air Station Point Mugu, California
The museum's collection includes both a Regulus and a Regulus II missile
 Museum, Pearl Harbor, Hawaii

Veterans Memorial Museum, Huntsville, Alabama
Regulus II missile
Smithsonian Institution, National Air and Space Museum
Regulus I on display at Steven F. Udvar-Hazy Center
New Jersey Naval Museum, Hackensack, New Jersey
Regulus with intact engine
US Navy Pacific Missile Range Facility, Barking Sands, island of Kauai, Hawaii
Regulus I restored in 2011 on static display inside the North Gate

Operators

United States Navy (from 1955 to 1964)

See also
List of missiles
SSBN Deterrent Patrol insignia

References

External links

USS Halibut Webpage
US Navy Photos & Documentary film produced by Nick T. Spark,  "Regulus: The First Nuclear Missile Submarines"  which aired initially on the History Channel in Europe.
Carolinas Aviation Museum
 "Regulus: The First Nuclear Missile Submarines"

Nuclear cruise missiles of the United States
Nuclear cruise missiles of the United States Navy
Cruise missiles of the Cold War
Cold War nuclear missiles of the United States
Vought
Military equipment introduced in the 1950s